The Frauen DFB-Pokal 1990–91 was the 11th season of the cup competition, Germany's second-most important title in women's football. In the final which was held in Berlin on 22 June 1991 Grün-Weiß Brauweiler defeated TSV Siegen 1–0.

Participants

First round

Replay

Quarter-finals

Replay

Semi-finals

Final

See also 

 Bundesliga 1990–91
 1990–91 DFB-Pokal men's competition

References 

DFB-Pokal Frauen seasons
Pokal
Fra